Rodica Daniela Nagel (née Moroianu; born 18 November 1970) is a French-Romanian former long-distance runner who competed in distances from 3000 metres to the half marathon. She was active from 1987 to 2007. She competed for her native Romania until June 1997, after which point she competed for her adopted nation, France.

She competed at six editions of the IAAF World Cross Country Championships and also ran at the 1999 IAAF World Indoor Championships and the 2002 IAAF World Half Marathon Championships. She was a team bronze medallist at the 2001 IAAF World Cross Country Championships with France. Her highest individual placing, seventh, came in the short race of the 1998 edition. Her sole international individual medal was a silver in the 5000 metres at the 1997 Francophonie Games.

She was twice a champion at the French Cross Country Championships, winning the short race in 1998 and the long race in 2002. In her road running career she had wins at the Humarathon 10K in 1997 and Giro di Castelbuono in 2001.

International competitions

National titles
French Cross Country Championships
Long race: 2002
Short race: 1998

References

External links

Living people
1970 births
French female long-distance runners
Romanian female long-distance runners
Romanian emigrants to France